"Shut Up" is a song by American rapper Trick Daddy, released on November 22, 1999 as the lead single from his third studio album Book of Thugs: Chapter AK Verse 47 (2000). It features American rappers Deuce Poppito, Trina and C.O. The song was produced by Black Mob Group.

Background and composition
The instrumental of the song features a riff of trombones and tubas performed by the marching band of Miami Northwestern Senior High School, where Trick Daddy and Trina graduated from.

Critical reception
Writing for AllMusic, Jason Birchmeier commented, "Above all though, Book of Thugs boasts 'Shut Up,' his rowdiest club-banger yet, also notable for reprising the dynamic Trick Daddy-Trina collaboration that had made 'Nann Nigga' such a success two years earlier." Steve "Flash" Juon of RapReviews praised the song, writing "the thuggish 'Shut Up' has that uniquely chunky horn funk and simple 'Uh-huh, okay, whassup? SHUT UP' chorus that will win fast converts at the club."

Music video
The music video begins with Trick Daddy at an album signing, and leaving due to being badgered by a news reporter asking him if he plans on "doing it again". Trick replies, "I'mma let the band deal wit it." The clip then shows Miami Northwestern High's marching band performing on a football field.

In popular culture
The song is featured on the soundtrack of the 1999 film Any Given Sunday.

Charts

References

1999 songs
1999 singles
Trick Daddy songs
Trina songs
Songs written by Trick Daddy
Songs written by Trina
Atlantic Records singles
Posse cuts